Gustavo Javier Aprile Retta (born August 10, 1988) is an Uruguayan footballer who plays as a midfielder. He has played for clubs in Italy, Argentina, Mexico and Brazil as well as his native Uruguay.

References
 Profile at BDFA
 

1988 births
Living people
Uruguayan footballers
Uruguayan expatriate footballers
S.S.C. Bari players
Rampla Juniors players
C.A. Bella Vista players
Cerro Largo F.C. players
Racing Club de Montevideo players
Club Atlético Temperley footballers
Expatriate footballers in Argentina
Expatriate footballers in Italy
Association football midfielders